Walker-Woodward-Schaffer House, also known as the Jane Darwell Birthplace, is a historic home located at Palmyra, Marion County, Missouri.  It was built about 1868, and is a two-story, three bay, Italianate style brick dwelling. It has a two-story rear wing with a two-story gallery porch. Both sections have hipped roofs with bracketed cornices. A verandah spans the front of the house.  It was the birthplace of actress Jane Darwell.

It was added to the National Register of Historic Places in 1984.

References

Houses on the National Register of Historic Places in Missouri
Italianate architecture in Missouri
Houses completed in 1868
Buildings and structures in Marion County, Missouri
National Register of Historic Places in Marion County, Missouri